The 2017 FIBA U16 European Championship Division C was played in Andorra la Vella, Andorra, from 23 to 30 July 2017. Ten teams participated in the competition. Armenia men's national under-16 basketball team won the tournament.

Participating teams

 (hosts)

First round

Group A

Group B

9th place match

5th–8th place playoffs

Championship playoffs

Final standings

References

External links
FIBA official website

C
FIBA U16 European Championship Division C
2017–18 in European basketball
2017 in Andorran sport
International basketball competitions hosted by Andorra
Sports competitions in Andorra la Vella
July 2017 sports events in Europe